Rig Sefid (also Romanized as Rīg Sefīd; also known as Rokh-e Sefīd) is a village in Dehpir-e Shomali Rural District, in the Central District of Khorramabad County, Lorestan Province, Iran. At the 2006 census, its population was 173, in 41 families.

References 

Towns and villages in Khorramabad County